Oshie Ridge is found in Obanliku Local Government of Cross River State in Nigeria.The ridge is about  high above sealevel. The word  Oshie or Ushie denotes justice in the various languages spoken by the former and current inhabitants of the Oshie ridge. In fact, the name Oshie also spelt Ushie, is a popular male name for the Bekwarra, Obudu and Obanliku  people.

Oshie Ridge is one of the two ridges making the Sankwala Mountains with the other ridge known as Sankwala.

The Oshie Plateau 
Oshie Ridge has a relatively flat top, forming a plateau on the ridge. The plateau is known as the Obudu Plateau.

The Plateau has a ranch developed on it by three Scottish ranchers named McCaughley, Hugh Jones and Crawfeild in 1951, after McCaughley first explored the sankwala mountain ranges in 1949 and invited his remaining two fellow ranchers Hugh Jones and Crawfeild to develop the ranch. The ranch contains cattle and is popularly known as the Obudu Cattle Ranch.

See also 
Sankwala Mountains

Obudu Cattle Ranch

References

Landforms of Nigeria
Ridges
Landforms of Africa